Hotel Astoria is a design hotel located next to the Central Station in Copenhagen, Denmark. The building is an early example of Functionalist architecture in Denmark.

History

The building was designed as a station hotel for the Danish State Railways by Ole Falkentorp, who had started his career in the State Railways' design office before forming his own practice. The hotel was built from 1934 to 1935 as the first luxury hotel in Copenhagen.

In 2007, Hotel Astoria was taken over by DGI-byen. The new owner commissioned GUBI to redesign the interior while preserving many of the original features. The revolving doors, the first in Denmark, are still present at the main entrance, and one of the luxury rooms has been maintained exactly as it was in 1935. Relying on black and white set off by tones of deep purple and greyish blue, a new colour scheme has been selected and the building has been fitted out with artistically designed, custom-made furniture.

On 1 July 2011 the hotel was taken over by Zleep Hotels. On 1 January 2014, Brøchner Hotels took over management of the hotel. On 1 October 2021, CIC Hospitality took over management of Hotel Astoria.

Architecture

The hotel consists of a long slender wing forming a barrier between the courtyard in front of the main entrance to the Central Station, which partly opens to the underground rail lines, and Reventlowsgade, the street on the Vesterbro side of the station.

An example of architecture parlante, the building is intended to resemble a steam locomotive, with its connotations of travel and movement encapsulating the essence of the site, and as an expression of the fascination with progress and technology which was typical of the time. It consists of an expressive constellation of cubist volumes, culminating in the narrow facade looking out over Vesterbrogade which is topped by a "hood ornament" in the shape of a winged wheel bearing a crown, a sculptural representation of the old logo of the Danish State Railways. The vertical, exterior hotel sign is in the full height of the building. At the other end of the building, there is a cylindrical staircase tower with a helical window.

Great care was taken by E. Schmidt, the technical designer, in drawing up the detailed specifications for a building which was to be constructed using Asger Skovgaard Ostenfeld's recently developed deformation technique for reinforced concrete structures. The finish on the four-inch-thick walls with metal-framed windows was achieved by manual bush hammering.

The hotel has been an inspiration for Peter Clash's design of the RIBA Award-winning Sleeperz Hotel in Cardiff, Wales.

Gallery

See also
 Arbejdernes Landsbank
 Skovshoved Petrol Station

References

External links

 Pictures and renderings from the Royal Danish Art Academy Library

Hotels in Copenhagen
Hotel Astoria
Hotel buildings completed in 1935
Hotels established in 1935
Railway hotels
Hotel Astoria
Hotel Astoria